Paresk (also Romanized as Paresg; also known as Paresk-e Soflá and Parāsh) is a village in Honam Rural District, in the Central District of Selseleh County, Lorestan Province, Iran. At the 2006 census, its population was 436, in 90 families.

References 

Towns and villages in Selseleh County